Salnava Manor is a manor in Salnava Parish, Ludza Municipality in the Latgale region of Latvia. Presently Salnava Manor house is used as school building.

History 
Salnava Manor was property of Barons Vulfiuss ( or Wulffius ) from the 1860s up until 1944. It came to the Wulfiuss family through Countess Jekaterina Sollugub who married into the Wulffius family.

See also
Malnava Manor
List of palaces and manor houses in Latvia

References

External links
  Salnava Manor

Manor houses in Latvia
Ludza Municipality
Latgale